Tangled Tales: The Misadventures of a Wizard’s Apprentice is a computer game developed by Origin Systems in 1989 for the Apple II, MS-DOS, and Commodore 64.

Plot
In Tangled Tales: The Misadventures of a Wizard’s Apprentice, the player is a young apprentice wizard without friends, spells, or money, about to go out and learn the wizard trade. The player is given a quest to complete in each new scenario, during the course of which solves various puzzles, adds new party members, and learns new spells. Characters, plots and tropes encountered in the game are derived from various mythological and fictional universes, such as a werewolf, a surfer, a snowman, Goldilocks (a thief), and Isaac Newton. The game consists of three separate scenarios, each must be completed before going on to the next, but the player can always go back to an old area in case something is missed.

Gameplay
The screen is divided into several areas: One displays the player's view of the world, one shows a bird's-eye view of the player's position, one contains the function icons, and one is a small text-information area. The player can select a function to move, talk, cast a spell, get or drop an item, and so on.

Reception
The game was reviewed in 1991 in Dragon #166 by Patricia and Steve Sheets in "The Role of Computers" column. The reviewers gave the game 4 out of 5 stars. Compute! stated that Tangled Tales was a good introductory game for those new to adventures. Scorpia of Computer Gaming World gave the game a mixed review, saying, "it appears to be an attempt to integrate adventure game elements with role-playing elements, and this attempt is not entirely successful." The review also noted puzzles were solved primarily by having the right person in the party, "which reduces the main character to spectator at many critical points in the game."

Tangled Tales was perhaps more noted for its controversial copy protection scheme, which involved saving games to the original disk on Track 0. Reviewers complained that it would cause the heads on the Apple Disk II and Commodore 1541 to bang against the drive stop and throw them out of alignment and that it was advisable to back the original game disks as quickly as possible and avoid using them.

Reviews
The Games Machine - Dec, 1989
ASM (Aktueller Software Markt) - Apr, 1990

References

External links
Tangled Tales: The Misadventures of a Wizard's Apprentice at MobyGames

1989 video games
Adventure games
Apple II games
Commodore 64 games
DOS games
Role-playing video games
Video games developed in the United States